Ivan Semenovych Nechuy-Levytsky (born Levytsky;  – 2 April 1918) was a well-known Ukrainian writer.

Biography
In 1847 he entered the Bohuslav religious school. Upon graduation from the Kiev Theological Academy in 1865, he taught Russian language, history, and geography in the Poltava Theological Seminary (1865–1866) and, later, in different gymnasiums in Kalisz, Siedlce (1867–1872), and Kyshyniv (1873–1874).

He started writing in 1865. His works appeared in Kievan and Galician publishing houses and periodicals such as Rada, Pravda, Dilo, and Zoria magazines. His  includes social and popular history novels, dramas, comedies, and fairy tales. Among his most famous works are the novel Kaidash's Family (1878) and the comedy At Kozhumyaky (1875), which was later remade into the play Chasing Two Hares by Mykhailo Starytsky. In 1961 the play was adapted as a popular comedy movie of the same name.

Ivan Nechuy-Levytsky died of hunger and illness on 2 April, 1918 in one of almshouses of Kyiv during the First World War. He was buried at the Baikove Cemetery.

Bibliography
 'Zhyttiepys' Ivana Levyts’koho (Nechuia), napysana nym samym,’ S’vit, no. 7 (1888)
 Iefremov, Serhii. Nechui-Levyts’kyi (Kyiv 1924)
 Mezhenko, Iurii. 'Ivan Semenovych Nechui-Levyts’kyi,’ Tvory, 1 (Kyiv 1926)
 Bilets’kyi, Oleksander. 'Ivan Semenovych Levyts’kyi (Nechui),’ Tvory v chotyr’okh tomakh, 1 (Kyiv 1956)
 Pokhodzilo, M. Ivan Nechui-Levyts’kyi (Kyiv 1960)
 Krutikova, N. Tvorchist' I.S. Nechuia-Levyts’koho (Kyiv 1961)
 Ivanchenko, R. Ivan Nechui-Levyts’kyi: Narys zhyttia i tvorchosti (Kyiv 1980)
 Tarnawsky Maxim, The all-encompassing eye of Ukraine: Ivan Nechui-Levyts'kyi’s realist prose, Toronto, University of Toronto Press, 2015, 384 pp.,  (in English)

Screen adaptations 

 Kaidash's Family (1993–1996) — a 2-episode mini-series directed by Volodymyr Horodko for the Kozak Consortium.
 To Catch the Kaidash (2020) — a 12-episode television series based on Kaidash's family novel, adapted by Natalka Vorozhbyt and produced by STB channel.

References

External links
 Encyclopedia of Ukraine Vol. 3. 1993
 Krys Svitlana, ‘Book review: the all-encompassing eye of Ukraine: Ivan Nechui-Levyts'kyi’s realist prose, by Maxim Tarnawsky…’ Canadian Slavonic Papers, 30 Jun 2016 (online publication date)

1838 births
1918 deaths
Ukrainian dramatists and playwrights
Hromada (society) members
Ukrainian male writers
Burials at Baikove Cemetery